Hossam Abd Ellatif (born 8 March 1971) is a paralympic athlete from Egypt competing mainly in category F57 shot put and discus events.

Hossam competed in the shot put and discus in both the 2000 and 2004 Summer Paralympics both times winning bronze in the F57 discus.

References

External links
 

1971 births
Living people
Paralympic athletes of Egypt
Athletes (track and field) at the 2000 Summer Paralympics
Athletes (track and field) at the 2004 Summer Paralympics
Paralympic bronze medalists for Egypt
Medalists at the 2000 Summer Paralympics
Medalists at the 2004 Summer Paralympics
Egyptian male discus throwers
Egyptian male shot putters
Paralympic medalists in athletics (track and field)
Wheelchair discus throwers
Wheelchair shot putters
Paralympic discus throwers
Paralympic shot putters
21st-century Egyptian people